Cuttack Sadar is a Vidhan Sabha constituency of Cuttack district, Odisha.

This constituency includes Cuttack Sadar block, 3 wards of Cuttack and 14 Gram panchayats (Santapur, Isaniberhampur, Manpur, Janardanpur, Sirlo, Babujanga, Uttarkul, Manijanga, Palada, Mahammadpur, Nemalo, Tilakana, Kalamishri and Bandhupur) Nischintakoili block.

Elected Members

Thirteen elections were held between 1957 and 2009.
Elected members from the Cuttack Sadar constituency are:

 2019  (93): Chandra Sarathi Behera (BJD)
 2014: (93): Chandra Sarathi Behera (BJD)
 2009: (93): Kalindi Charan Behera (BJD)
 2004: (43): Pravat Ranjan Biswal (Independent)
 2000: (43): Nibedita Pradhan (BJP)
 1995: (43): Bijay Lakshmi Sahoo (Congress)
 1990: (43): Rajendra Singh (Janata Dal)
 1985: (43): Dolagobinda Pradhan (Congress)
 1980: (43): Dolagobinda Pradhan (Congress-I)
 1977: (43): Sangram Keshari Mohapatra (Janata Party)
 1974: (43): Trilochan Kanungo (Congress)
 1971: (42): Sura Sethi (Congress)
 1967: (42): Sukadeva Jena (Orissa Jana Congress)
 1961: (101): Laxman Mallick  (Congress)
 1957: (71): Purnananda Samal (Congress)

2019 Election Result

2014 Election Result

2009 Election Results
In 2009 election, Biju Janata Dal candidate  Kalindi Behera defeated Indian National Congress candidate Ashima Mahananda by a margin of 49,344 votes.

Notes

References

Assembly constituencies of Odisha
Politics of Cuttack district